My-T-Fine is a brand of pudding now marketed by Jel Sert.

History
Puddings are similar to custards, but thickened with cornstarch instead of eggs. Powdered mixes for puddings originated in England, where Andrew Bird created and began selling a mix for a cornstarch based custard in 1837. Puddings soon caught on in the United States as well, where My-T-Fine began selling the first boxed pudding mix (chocolate) in 1918.  My-T-Fine continues today, marketing powdered pudding mixes in a variety of flavors.
 Chocolate
 Lemon
 Vanilla
 Butterscotch
 Tapioca Vanilla
 Chocolate Fudge
 Pumpkin
 Tiramisu
 Sugar-Free Chocolate
 Sugar-Free Vanilla

Notes

External links
 Jel Sert's My-T-Fine website

Jel Sert brands
Brand name desserts